The DaSH PAdead simple human powered airplaneis a project led by Alec Proudfoot to build and fly a human-powered aircraft. The project's first flight on December 5, 2015, at Half Moon Bay Airport, was piloted by Proudfoot during which the aircraft flew .

Subsequent flight trials in February, June, and November 2016, have also been successful. The second November 5 flight, piloted by Craig Robinson, covered  and lasted four minutes.

The longest flight yet occurred on November 18, 2017, lasting 5 minutes and 20 seconds, covering 1.92 km.

Project history

Proudfoot started the DaSH PA project in late 2010 as a "for-fun, afterhours project to build a human powered airplane".

In October 2015, the team conducted wing load testing at the Hiller Aviation Museum in San Carlos, California.

Over its history, the DaSH PA team has included hundreds of volunteers, and as of November 2017, nine pilots.

Flights

Proudfoot wrote, "We've now had eight pilots fly a total of 22 flights, and the airplane has traveled about 11,000 meters in about 27-1/2 minutes of total flight time."

On December 5, 2015, the first flight at Half Moon Bay Airport, piloted by Proudfoot, was successful, but ended after a tail bracket broke. The problem was subsequently repaired.

On February 20 and 21, 2016, the team made six successful flights, with six different pilots, at Half Moon Bay Airport.

On June 25 and 26, 2016, the team made another five flights at Moffett Federal Field, close to their headquarters in Silicon Valley, California; on the last flight, the plane crash-landed after difficulty compensating for a crosswind, damaging the nose-wheel tube, fairing, and propeller.

On November 5, 2016, the team made eight flights with seven pilots at Moffett Field.

On December 11 and 17, 2016, the team conducted more flights at Moffett Field. On the last flight, piloted by Alec Proudfoot, torsional divergence resulted in wing collapse.

In October and November 2017, the team had a total of 17 additional flights at Moffett.

See also

 List of human-powered aircraft

References

External links

 
 Project video playlists

Aircraft first flown in 2015
Human-powered aircraft
Single-engined tractor aircraft
High-wing aircraft